Wayne Snyder is an associate professor at Boston University known for his work in E-unification theory.

He was raised in Yardley, Pennsylvania, worked in his father's aircraft shop, attended the Berklee School of Music, and obtained an MA in Augustan poetry at Tufts University.
He then studied computer science, and earned his Ph.D. at the University of Pennsylvania in 1988.
In 1987 he came to Boston University, teaching introductory computer science, and researching on automated reasoning, and, more particularly, E-unification.

Selected publications

References

External links
 Home page
 Publications at DBLP
 Publications at Snyder's home page
 

Theoretical computer scientists
American computer scientists
Living people
Year of birth missing (living people)